Ludvík Podéšť, pseudonym Ludvík Binovský (19 December 1921 in Dubňany – 27 February 1968 in Prague), was a Czech composer, conductor, music journalist and editor.

Life and career
Podéšť studied music composition at Brno Conservatory under Jaroslav Kvapil from 1941, graduating in 1948. He became a music reporter for the Czech Radio studio in Brno while studying musicology at Masaryk University under Bohumír Štědroň and Jan Racek. In Brno, he also worked as director of the Radost Youth Choir, for whom he wrote a large number of choral works. For the years 1953–1956, Podéšť replaced Radim Drejsl (1923–1953) as director of the Vít Nejedlý Army Artistic Ensemble (Armádní umělecký soubor Víta Nejedlého) in Prague, then during 1958–1961, he worked as an editor of music broadcasts for Czechoslovak Television. After 1961 he devoted himself exclusively to composition, only occasionally working as a freelancer.  From 1966 until his death, Podéšť lived in Morocco with his wife, who was a doctor.

Podéšť composed two operas, five operettas, music for Czech feature films, orchestral music, vocal and chamber works. His first classical works were influenced by constructivism (such as the String Quartet No. 1, the piano fantasies Písně smutné paní, the Woodwind Quintet and Cello Sonata), but later found inspiration in folklore and in the work of the Moravian composer Leoš Janáček (for example the symphonic poem Raymonda Dienová, the orchestral rhapsody Advent and Maminka for children's chorus and orchestra). With the works created during his years in Morocco, Podéšť utilized elements of the local music culture and began to modernize his musical language (for example Hamada for orchestra and the Partita for strings, guitar and percussion).

His composing style contains contradictory elements; he composed classical music as well as popular songs promoting optimistic visions of the Czechoslovak communist régime. Following the suicide of Radim Drejsl he became one of the most important Czech composers of the politically engaged songs called "budovatelské písně". Podéšť composed a number of songs within the genre of popular music and "trampská hudba". His songs are catchy, especially noted for their pleasing melodies and jolly optimism.

Podéšť is the author of several professional journal studies such as Za odkazem V. Nejedlého (Vít Nejedlý Legacy; Hudební rozhledy, Vol. 8, 1955), Harmonická práce L. Janáčka (The Harmonic Work of Leoš Janáček; Hudební rozhledy, Vol. 10, 1957) and Hovoříme o hudbě (Talking about Music; Blok, Vol. 3, p. 302).

Selected works
Stage
 Když se Anička vdávala (When Anička Married), Operetta (1950); libretto by Pantůček and Jiří Štuchal
 Slepice a kostelník, Operetta (1951); libretto by Jaroslav Zrotal and Pantůček
 Bez cymbálu nejsou hody, Operetta (1953); libretto by Michal Sedloň
 Tři apokryfy, 3 One-Act Chamber Operas after stories from Apocryphal Tales by Karel Čapek (1957–1958); libretto by the composer
   Staré zlaté časy, t. pod názvem O úpadku doby (The Good Old Days)
   Svatá noc (Holy Night)
   Romeo a Julie (Romeo and Juliet)
 Hrátky s čertem (Playing with the Devil), Comic Opera in 7 scenes (1957–1960); libretto by the composer after the play by Jan Drda
 Emílek a dynamit, Operetta (1960); libretto by Vilém Dubský and Josef Barchánek
 Filmová hvězda (Film-Star), Operetta (1960); libretto by K. M. Walló
 Noci na seně (A Night on the Hay), Operetta in 3 acts; libretto by Zdeněk Endris and Zdeněk Borovec

Orchestral
 Symfonie (1947–1948)
 Fašaňk, Suite for orchestra (1951)
 Raymonda Dienová, Symphonic Poem (1950, revised 1952)
 Dva moravské tance (2 Moravian Dances) for orchestra (1953)
   Odzemek
   Cigáň
 Čínské jaro (Chinese Spring), Suite from the film for orchestra (1954)
 Advent, Rhapsody on themes from the film score after Jarmila Glazarová for large orchestra (1956)
 Suite for orchestra (1956)
 Siciliana, Variations for orchestra (1957)
 Azurové moře for orchestra (1967)
 Hamada, Study in Monotony for orchestra (1967)
 Partita pro smyčce, kytaru a bicí for electric guitar, percussion (4 players) and string orchestra (1967)

Concertante
 Hudba ve starém slohu (Music in Old Style) for piano and string orchestra (1949)
 Concerto No. 1 for piano and orchestra (1952, revised 1953)
 Concerto "Jarní serenáda" (Spring Serenade) for violin and orchestra (1953)
 Concerto No. 2 for piano and orchestra (1958–1959)
 Concertino for 2 cimbaloms and orchestra (1962)
 Concertino for 2 cellos and chamber orchestra (1965)
 Valčíkové variace (Waltz Variations) for trumpet and orchestra (1965)

Chamber music
 String Quartet No. 1 (1942)
 Litanie, String Quartet in 1 movement (1944)
 Hojačky for 2 clarinets and piano (1945)
 Woodwind Quintet (1946)
 Sonata for violin and piano (1947)
 Pět jarních dní (Five Spring Days), String Quartet No. 2 (1948)
 Suite for viola and piano (1956)
 Sonata for 2 cellos and piano (1957)
 Tři skladby (3 Pieces) for violin and piano (1958)

Piano
 Písně smutné paní, 4 Fantasies (1941)
 Sonatina (1945)
 Stesky, Cycle of Miniatures (1946)
 Suite (1946)
 Sonata (1946)

Vocal
 Gitandžalí for low voice and piano (1942); words by I. Hubíková (1942)
 Písně na slova Olgy Scheinpflugové (Songs on Words of Olga Scheinpflugová) for alto and piano (1943)
 Maminčiny písně for soprano and piano (1943); words by Jaroslav Seifert
 Popěvky o vojácích for soprano, tenor and orchestra (1945); words by the composer
 Písně a popěvky for medium voice and chamber ensemble (1946); words by Vítězslav Nezval (1946)
 Písně z koncentráku for baritone and orchestra (1946); words by Josef Čapek
 Legendy o panně Marii (Legends of the Virgin Mary) for alto (1947)
 Měsíce (The Moon), Song Cycle on Poems of Karel Toman for soprano and orchestra (1948, revised 1957–1958)
 Květomluva for child soloist and chamber ensemble (1948)
 Každodenní malé písně for medium voice and piano (1948); words by the composer
 Tiše for voice and piano (1948–1949); words by František Halas
 Moja rodná for tenor and orchestra (1949); words by Ján Kostra
 Domů jedu domovinou svou for tenor and orchestra (1954); words by Oldřich Mikulášek; won first prize in the 1955 Great Jubilee Competition of the Czech Composers Union (Velká jubilejní soutěž Svazu českých skladatelů)
 Maminka (The Mummy), Song for medium voice and piano (1954); words by Jaroslav Seifert
 Písně na staré motivy (Songs on Ancient Themes) for baritone (or alto) and chamber orchestra (1955–1956)
 Divoký chmel, 4 Songs for baritone and piano (1960); words by Ivan Skála
 Každodenní malé písně, Song Cycle for high voice and piano (1967–1968)
 Tesknice for low voice, flute, viola, cello and piano; words by František Halas

Choral
 Smrt (Death), Cantata (1942); words by Olga Scheinpflugová
 Píseň o rodné zemi for male chorus (1946); words by Jaroslav Seifert
 Píseň o Stalinu, Cantata (1950); words by Stanislav Kostka Neumann
 Píseň o veliké době, Cantata (1950–1951); words by Ivan Skála
 Láska za lásku for mixed chorus and orchestra (1951)
 Veselé město, Suite for mixed chorus and large variety band (1952–1953)
 Láska pěknější, Cantata for soprano, alto, tenor, bass, female chorus and piano (1954–1955); words by Josef Kainar; won the Josef Bohuslav Foerster Prize, second prize in the 1955 Great Jubilee Competition of the Czech Composers Union (Velká jubilejní soutěž Svazu českých skladatelů)
 Praha (Prague) for male chorus (1955)
 Maminka, Song for children's chorus and orchestra (1963); words by Jaroslav Seifert
 Nadešel čas for unison chorus and piano; words by Stanislav Kostka Neumann
 Šťastnou cestu for soloist, chorus and orchestra
 Vojáček modrooký for soprano, male chorus and chamber orchestra with cimbalom
 Všední den for unison chorus; words by T. Pantůček
 Všichni jsme mladí for mixed chorus and orchestra

Film scores

Sources
 Ludvík Podéšť at the Czech Music Dictionary
 Ludvík Podéšť at the Database of Czech Composers and Compositions (Databáze skladeb a skladatelů)

References

External links
 
 
 
 

1921 births
1968 deaths
People from Dubňany
Czech classical composers
Czech male classical composers
Czech film score composers
Czech music journalists
Male film score composers
20th-century classical composers
20th-century Czech male musicians
Masaryk University alumni
Brno Conservatory alumni